KLBQ (101.5 MHz), broadcasting as 101.5 The Hog, is an FM radio station broadcasting a classic country format. Licensed to Junction City, Arkansas, United States, the station serves the El Dorado, Arkansas area. The station is currently owned by Noalmark Broadcasting Corporation and features programming from ABC Radio.

History
The station went on the air as KHBX on July 17, 1998. On August 31, 2000, the station changed its call sign to KMLK. The station moved its community of license from El Dorado to Junction City on April 21, 2017.

The station founder was Jerome Orr, who had worked for Noalmark at KELD, El Dorado and at Hobbs. Orr had recently been managing the company's then KIOL in Midland/Odessa.

On July 13, 2017, KMLK and its urban adult contemporary format moved to 98.7 FM El Dorado, swapping frequencies and call signs with country-formatted KLBQ.

References

External links

LBQ (FM)
Noalmark Broadcasting Corporation radio stations
Radio stations established in 2000
2000 establishments in Arkansas
Classic country radio stations in the United States
Union County, Arkansas